William Lemuel "Willie" Lumpkin is a fictional supporting character appearing in American comic books published by Marvel Comics. The character is best known as the mailman of the Fantastic Four in their self-titled comic book.

Willie Lumpkin was portrayed by Stan Lee in the 2005 film Fantastic Four.

Publication history

Newspaper comic strip

The character was originally created for a syndicated daily comic strip by writer Stan Lee and artist Dan DeCarlo. Lee recalled in a 1998 interview that,

Willie Lumpkin drew humor from the people and situations Willie would encounter along his mail delivery route in the small town of Glenville. The daily strip ran from December 1959 to May 6, 1961. A Sunday strip ran through May 28.

Marvel Comics
Lee and artist Jack Kirby then introduced their comic book version of Willie Lumpkin in Fantastic Four #11 (Feb. 1963). The comic book Lumpkin is depicted as significantly older than in the comic strip, though the character's good nature was retained, as were references to his past as a mailman in Glenville, which the comic book placed in Nebraska.

In his first comic book appearance, Lumpkin is represented as having befriended the Fantastic Four, to whom he makes regular fan mail deliveries at their Baxter Building headquarters in New York City. He half-jokingly requests to join the team on the grounds that he has the "power" to wiggle his ears.

Lumpkin appeared in his own solo feature in Marvel Comics Presents #18 (May 1989). In this parody of A Christmas Carol, he is visited by the Ghost of Christmas Past, who had intended to haunt cantankerous Spider-Man nemesis J. Jonah Jameson but couldn't find his address. The story concludes with the normally amiable postman deciding he hates Christmas.

Fictional character biography
In Marvel Comics, Willie Lumpkin serves as the postal worker mailman whose Manhattan route includes the joint home and office of the superhero group the Fantastic Four. On occasion he falls into the danger that typically surrounds the adventuring heroes. Examples include a story in which he is forced to spend Christmas Eve locked in a closet while the Fantastic Four fight the Super-Skrull, or when he helped to save the team from the Mad Thinker. This incident involved Reed's trust in Lumpkin; he had hired the mailman to manipulate the machinery as part of a safety routine. Later Lumpkin is mind-controlled into accessing Doctor Doom's time machine by a minion of Immortus. An alien Skrull also impersonates him in another story to infiltrate the Fantastic Four's headquarters.

He also briefly dated Peter Parker's Aunt May. When May briefly appeared to have died, Lumpkin grieved and was seen to befriend a new companion named Doreen Greenwald.

Lumpkin has since retired, and his niece Wilhemina "Billie" Lumpkin has taken his position as the Fantastic Four's mail carrier.

He was interviewed about the Fantastic Four on the news show Lateline, saying how  though the group took on cosmic menaces, they always found time to greet him. Sometime later, the super-team, miniaturized, entered his body to remove an otherwise inoperable brain tumor.

Lumpkin was later hired as a biology teacher for the 'Future Foundation', a school founded by the Fantastic Four. Willie enjoyed a trip to the moon when the Future Foundation and associates decided to hold a party. Lumpkin is also hired as a moderator for the FF's online presences.

Other versions

Ultimate Marvel
In the Ultimate Marvel Universe, there is a government agent named Lumpkin, who works for the agency that runs the think-tank/school in the Baxter Building. His first name is not mentioned. He is in his forties and overweight. He is initially shown recruiting Reed Richards. He has expressed a romantic interest in Grimm's mother. Lumpkin and three of his men assist the Four in confronting the Mad Thinker, a former Baxter Building student. The entire group is knocked out by tranquilizing chemicals. Reed saves everyone.

In other media

Television
Lumpkin appears in the Fantastic Four: World's Greatest Heroes episode "My Neighbor was a Skrull" voiced by Colin Murdock.

Film
 Lumpkin appears in the 2005 Fantastic Four film portrayed by Stan Lee. Identified on-screen only as Willie, he is portrayed as a chipper mailman who delivers a letter to Dr. Richards as the Fantastic Four arrive at the Baxter Building. It was the first time in Lee's cameo appearances in a Marvel Comics-based film that he portrayed a character he created.

References

External links
Willie Lumpkin at Don Markstein's Toonopedia. Archived from the original on September 16, 2015.
Willie Lumpkin at Marvel Wiki
Willie Lumpkin at Comic Vine

1959 comics debuts
1961 comics endings
Gag-a-day comics
Comics set in the United States
Comics characters introduced in 1959
Fantastic Four
Fictional characters from Nebraska
Fictional characters from New York City
Fictional United States Postal Service workers
Superhero film characters
Characters created by Dan DeCarlo
Characters created by Stan Lee
Characters created by Jack Kirby
Male characters in comics